Hillside may refer to the side of a hill.

Places

Australia
Hillside mine, a proposed mine on the Yorke Peninsula, South Australia
Hillside, New South Wales
Hillside, Victoria, a suburb of Melbourne

Canada 
Hillside, Nova Scotia

United Kingdom
Hillside, Merseyside, a suburb of Southport
Hillside railway station, the railway station serving Hillside, Merseyside
Hillside, Angus, Scotland

United States
Hillside, Colorado
Hillside, Illinois
Hillside, Indianapolis, Indiana
Hillside, New Jersey
Hillside, New York
Hillside, Wisconsin
Hillside, Portland, Oregon, a neighborhood in Northwest Portland

Zimbabwe
Hillside, Harare

Historic buildings

United Kingdom 
 Hillside, Brighton and Hove

United States 
 Hillside (Norfolk, Connecticut)
 Hillside (Davenport, Iowa)
 Hillside (Plymouth, Massachusetts)
 Hillside (Natchez, Mississippi)
 Hillside (Greensboro, North Carolina)
 Hillside (Carlisle, South Carolina)
 Hillside (Charles Town, West Virginia)

Entertainment
 Hillside (TV series)
 "Hillside", a song by E-40 from his 2011 album Revenue Retrievin': Overtime Shift

See also
 Hillside Animal Sanctuary, UK
 Hillside Cemetery (disambiguation)
 Hillside Engineering, Dunedin, New Zealand
 Hillside Festival, a summer festival in Guelph, Ontario, Canada
 Hillside Historic District (disambiguation)
 Hillside School (disambiguation)